Gabriel Montiel Gutiérrez (born 23 September 1989), better known by his pseudonyms Werevertumorro and Gaborever,  is a Mexican YouTuber whose channel primarily consisted of vlogs and gameplays. He is also a former footballer who played as a defensive midfielder for Murciélagos in the Liga Premier de Ascenso (third tier of football in Mexico).

After announcing a hacked on 25 July 2022, he informed on August that both his YouTube channels got deleted.

Club career

Águilas de Teotihuacán
Gutiérrez began his career at 16 playing for Arcesvids's affiliate youth team Águilas de Teotihuacán. He made his debut during the Apertura 2007 season, August 18, 2007, in a 3–0 defeat against Real Olmec Sport. He scored his first goal on September 19, 2007, against Tolcayuca in a 1–0 win for Águilas. He made a second goal October 10, 2007 against Real Halcones, the match ended in a 2–2 draw. In total Gutiérrez made 12 appearances and 2 goals for Águilas de Teotihuacán.

Murciélagos
On 7 August 2014, Gutiérrez announced on Twitter that he was joining Murciélagos for the Apertura 2014 season, alongside his mate Israel Rivera, who also takes part of Werevertumorro Crew. Gabriel only played for 5 minutes in the game played against Universidad Autónoma de Zacatecas, the final result was 1-1.

Career statistics

Club

References 

1989 births
Living people
Spanish-language YouTubers
Footballers from Mexico City
Mexican footballers
Association football midfielders
Mexican YouTubers
Gaming YouTubers
Comedy YouTubers
YouTube vloggers
Murciélagos FC footballers
Liga Premier de México players